Syd Ball (born 24 January 1950) is a former professional tennis player from Australia.

Ball enjoyed most of his tennis success while playing doubles. During his career, he won seven doubles titles and finished runner-up an additional 14 times. Partnering Bob Giltinan, Ball finished runner-up at the 1974 Australian Open. He achieved a career-high doubles ranking of World No. 22 in 1977.

Syd is the father of former tour professional Carsten Ball.

On 30 August 2000, Ball was awarded the Australian Sports Medal for his commitment to tennis.

Career finals

Doubles (7 titles, 14 runner-ups)

References

External links
 
 

1950 births
Living people
Australian expatriate sportspeople in the United States 
Australian male tennis players
Tennis players from Sydney
Recipients of the Australian Sports Medal